Jangal Deh may refer to:
 Jangal Deh-e Bala
 Jangal Deh-e Pain